Lharn Poo Koo E-Joo  is a Thai children's television reality show produced by Workpoint Entertainment and hosted by Panya Nirunkul. In 2009, it was nominated for an International Emmy Award in the Children and Young People category, but was beaten by Dustbin Baby. Lharn Poo Koo E-Joo was the first Thai production to receive an International Emmy nomination. In 2008, the show won the Asian Television Award for Best Game or Quiz Programme.

References

Thai reality television series
Television series by Workpoint Entertainment
2000s Thai television series